Events from the year 1713 in Sweden

Incumbents
 Monarch – Charles XII

Events

 1 February - Skirmish at Bender.
 February - Siege of Tönning
 - Russian attack on Helsingfors. 
 - Russian victory at the Battle of Pälkäne.
 2 November - Princess Ulrika Eleonora appointed regent of Sweden in her brothers absence.
 - The Great Northern War plague outbreak reach Lund, Malmö and Ystad.

Births

 
 20 February - Anna Maria Elvia, writer (died 1784) 
 - Anna Maria Hilfeling, miniaturist  (died 1783) 
 – Brita Sophia De la Gardie, amateur actress and culture personality (died 1797) 
 Helena Escholin, vicar's wife  (died 1783)

Deaths

 
 
 
 Jean Grossaint De la Roche-yon, spy (died 1769)

References

 
Years of the 18th century in Sweden
Sweden